Mrs. A.V.N. College, founded in 1860, is an arts and science college in Visakhapatnam in the state of Andhra Pradesh, India.

History
The institution was founded in 1860 as a school and grew with the support of the public, especially the zamindars of the time. It gained the status of a high school in 1866 with a European headmaster, Mr. E. Winckler, who became the principal in 1878 when it was elevated to the status of a college in the name Hindu College as a second-grade college affiliated to Madras University.

Other principals who succeeded him were Messrs H. H. Anderson, R. S. Sheppard, W. Ramaiah, and P. T. Srinivasa Iyengar. In 1892, Ankitam Venkata Narasimha Rao, a landlord endowed the amount of Rs one lakh, an 11-acre site and a huge building, besides a  building grant of ₹15,000 in memory of his wife. The college thus came to be known by her name, i.e.,  Mrs. A.V.N College 

The college was started with a strength of 50 in 1878. In 1938, the institution celebrated its Diamond Jubilee. In 1938–39, the strength of the college was 227 and of the high school was 732.

Administration
Ms. Indrani Jagga Row, vice-chairperson, was appointed as correspondent of the college on 1 December 1993. She made a holy beginning of her  activities with the consecration of Lord Shiva in the temple constructed by Shri A. V. N. Jagga Row within the college premises. In 2014, Indrani Jaggarow's son, Sri A.V. Adeep Bhanoji Row, was appointed as correspondent and Indrani Jaggarow took the role of vice chairperson again. The Visakhapatnam district magistrate holds the authority of chairperson according to the will of the founder Sri A. V. Narasinga Row.

Academics
In 1960, the institution celebrated its centenary. In the beginning, the college had very few subject combinations at the Intermediate level, but now the college has many combinations of subjects both at Intermediate and Degree levels. In B.Sc., restructured courses were introduced like Bio-Chemistry, Fisheries, Electronics, Computer Science and Statistics. Every year, the college produces students achieving top ranks in IIT, EAMCET, EDCET, AUCET, LAWCET, Civil Services and university examinations.

Currently the courses offered by the institution are Primary and Secondary Schooling, Intermediate(formerly PUC), UG Courses (B.Sc., B.Com.), P.G. Course (M.Com.), Diploma in Engineering (Polytechnic), Diploma in Elementary Education (D.El.Ed.). The diploma courses were introduced in 2012.

The college was awarded NAAC Ä-grade by the peer review team in 2018.

Notable alumni
 Dwaram Venkataswamy Naidu, carnatic violinist 
 Alluri Sitarama Raju, revolutionary in the Indian independence movement 
 Sir C. V. Raman, Nobel Laureate, Physics
 Prof. C. R. Rao, mathematician (Padma Vibhushan)
 S. V. Ranga Rao, film actor
 Tenneti Viswanadham, politician and independence fighter

Principals of college

External links
 Official website

References

Universities and colleges in Visakhapatnam
Colleges in Andhra Pradesh
Colleges affiliated to Andhra University
1860 establishments in India
Educational institutions established in 1860
Buildings and structures in Visakhapatnam
Academic institutions formerly affiliated with the University of Madras